Fred de Heij (born February 21, 1960 in Amsterdam) is a Dutch cartoonist. He is the winner of the 2014 Stripschapprijs.

References

Dutch cartoonists
Winners of the Stripschapsprijs
Living people
1960 births
People from Amsterdam
21st-century Dutch male artists